Pierre Gandon was a French illustrator and engraver of postage stamps. He was born on 20 January 1899 in L'Haÿ-les-Roses (Val-de-Marne) and died on 23 July 1990.

Youth
His father Gaston Gandon was himself an engraver at the Institut de gravure of Paris and designed stamps for some countries and two for France (Le Burelé 50 Francs in 1936 and the cathedral of Strasbourg in 1939).

Pierre Gandon studied in Paris at the École Estienne, then at the École des Beaux-Arts. He won his first of many prizes in 1921 : the Prix de Rome.

Stamp designer
Gandon answered an advertisement in a paper and finally obtained the right to design "Femme indigène", his first postage stamp series issued 1941 in the French colony of Dahomey.

The same year was issued his first stamp for France : the coat of arms of Reims. 

Four times he received the Grand Prix de l'Art philatélique during his career that including:

 « Haute couture parisienne» (Paris high sewing), drawn by Gandon, engraved by Jules Piel, France, 1953.

 « La jeune fille de Bora Bora » (The Girl of Bora Bora), Drawn and Engraved by Gandon, French Polynesia, 1955.

 « Les joueurs de cartes » (Card Players), painting by Paul Cézanne, France, 1961. This stamp was part of the first series of paintings that the French Post issued.

 « La Dame à la licorne » (The Lady and the Unicorn), medieval tapestry, France, 1964.

Among the most famous stamps designed and engraved by Gandon are two series of female allegories in common use of the 1940s, 1970s and 1980s:

three French definitive stamps series :

 Marianne de Gandon series issued at the end of the Second World War,
 Sabine de Gandon series inspired by Jacques-Louis David's The Intervention of the Sabine Women, issued during the 1970s,
 and Liberté de Gandon series inspired by Eugène Delacroix's Liberty Leading the People. He was 82 years old when he engraved this stamp.

His last stamp was issued for the Journée du timbre 1983.

In total, Pierre Gandon designed and/or engraved over 350 stamps for France  and over double that number for the French Colonies. He designed the first stamps issued by the Central African Republic in December 1959.

See also

References
 Stamps Review magazine, special issue No. 3, July–September 2003
 Alphonse Daudet's Lettres de mon moulin, illustrations Pierre Gandon, 1937 Librairie des Amateurs, Ferroud Publishers, Paris

Notes

1899 births
1990 deaths
People from L'Haÿ-les-Roses
20th-century engravers
French engravers
French illustrators
French stamp designers
Prix de Rome for engraving
20th-century French printmakers